The Institute for Creative Technologies (ICT) is a University Affiliated Research Center at the University of Southern California located in Playa Vista, California. ICT was established in 1999 with funding from the US Army.

Dr. Mike Andrews, chief scientist of the US Army is described as "founder of and inspiration behind" the ICT.  He followed up on discussions between US Army leadership (four-star general Paul J. Kern) and Disney Imagineering president Bran Ferren, on how to gain access to Hollywood entertainment industry expertise in high-technology areas such as computer-based Modeling & Simulation, and Virtual Reality.  The name was derived from Ferren's title at The Walt Disney Company.

It was created to combine the assets of a major research university with the creative resources of Hollywood and the game industry to advance the state-of-the-art in training and simulation. The institute's research has also led to applications for education, entertainment and rehabilitation, including virtual patients, virtual museum guides and Academy Award-winning visual effects technologies. Core areas include virtual humans, graphics, mixed-reality, learning sciences, games, storytelling and medical virtual reality.

ICT publications are available on Google Scholar: https://scholar.google.com/citations?user=n7umx68AAAAJ, and has been cited more than 100,000 times.

Honors and awards
Defense Modeling and Simulation Office (DMSO)/National Training Systems Association (NTSA) Outstanding Achievement in Modeling and Simulation Training Award given to the ICT (2000).
Army Modeling and Simulation Awards FY08. Distribution Management Cognitive Trainer(DMCT) and Bi-lateral Negotiation (BiLAT) Simulation.
The Interactive 360 degree Light Field Display (3D Display) was demonstrated at SIGGRAPH 2007, and won the award for "Best Emerging Technology.
ICT's virtual reality exposure therapy treatment for PTSD was honored with the Best Medical Application award at the 10th Virtual Reality International Conference in Laval, France.
2010 - Scientific and Engineering Academy Award 
Sigma cognitive architecture wins the Ray Kurzweil Awards at AGI 2011 and 2012
USC's Standard Patient - 2015 Serious Play Conference Winner of Gold Medal in Healthcare 
ELITE SHARP CTT - 2016 Office of Personnel Management Federal Executive Board (FEB) Innovation of the Year Award.
2018 - Second Academy Award for Technical Achievement 
2022 - Emmy (Technical Achievement)

Army affiliation
ICT is a DoD-sponsored University Affiliated Research Center (UARC) working in collaboration with the U.S. Soldier Center.  The ICT is one of the Army’s four University Affiliated Research Centers (UARC).  UARCs are a strategic United States Department of Defense (DoD) Research Center associated with an American university.  UARCs are formally established by the Under Secretary of Defense for Research and Engineering (USD(R&E)) to ensure that essential engineering and technology capabilities of particular importance to the DoD are maintained and readily available.  The mission of the ICT UARC is to conduct basic, applied, and advanced demonstration research to develop the new tools, methods, and technologies required to improve military training, education, and combat operations.  The ICT UARC accomplishes this mission by employing a resident faculty that leverages government research with the research capabilities of academia, private industry, and the commercial entertainment industry (e.g., Hollywood, theme parks, and the commercial gaming industry).  

Army program managers include Mr. Mark McAuliffe, Dr. Jim Blake, Dr. Jeff Wilkinson, Dr. John Hart (2008-2022) and Dr. Keith Brawner (2022-present).

Major projects and accomplishments

See also

 United States Army Simulation and Training Technology Center
 Immersive technology

References

External links
 
 ICT research projects

Institutes of the University of Southern California
Artificial intelligence laboratories
Computer science institutes in the United States
Laboratories in the United States
Military simulation
Playa Vista, Los Angeles
Research institutes in California
Research institutes established in 1999
1999 establishments in California
Science and technology in Greater Los Angeles